JPEG is a format for compressed digital images.

JPEG  may also refer to:

Joint Photographic Experts Group, the standardization group after which the JPEG coding format is named
Motion JPEG, a video compression method using JPEG still image compression, sometimes referred to as "JPEG"
JPEG File Interchange Format, a file format originally created to contain JPEG compressed images, frequently referred to as "JPEG"
Independent JPEG Group, the group maintaining an independent implementation of ISO/IEC JPEG
libjpeg, the implementation of JPEG as a software library
JPEG (album), a 2019 album by German band Digitalism

See also

Lossless JPEG
JPEG 2000
Motion JPEG 2000

JPG (disambiguation)